St Bernard's College (often abbreviated to SBC or SBC183) is a Catholic year 7 to 13 (form 1 to 7) secondary school for boys located at 183 Waterloo Rd, Lower Hutt, Wellington, New Zealand. The school was opened by the Marist Brothers in 1946.

The maximum roll is 680 pupils.

School crest
The school crest was designed by Brother Gerard who served as principal of the school from 1959 to 1964. The crest of St. Bernard's consists of a shield divided into three panels:

The left panel shows a sword and a crown, symbolising the need to "fight the good fight so as to gain the crown of victory." This is an allusion to an exhortation of the Apostle Paul regarding the Catholic striving to live for Christ.
The centre panel has three Fleur-de-lis, symbolic of three French connections with the school:
 St. Bernard was Abbot of Clairvaux in France and a great figure in the religious and political life of twelfth century Europe;
 Marcellin Champagnat founded the Marist Brothers of the Schools in France; and
 Bishop Pompallier, a Frenchman, was instrumental in bringing the Catholic faith to New Zealand.

The cross on the right panel was worn by the Crusaders on their shields. St Bernard promoted the Crusades.
Surmounting the shield is a combination of stars resting on a bar divided into three parts. The Latin inscription at the foot of the shield translates to "Look to the star, call upon Mary."

Sports
St. Bernard's College has offered many sports as extra-curricular activities. It currently offers athletics, badminton, basketball, cricket, cross country, football, golf, hockey, mountain biking, rowing, rugby, rugby league, rugby 7s, softball, swimming, tennis, touch rugby, volleyball and waterpolo.

List of principals
With Simon Stack's appointment at the start of 2016, fifteen principals have served St. Bernard's College since its formation in 1946.
Br. Bernard Fulton (1946)
Br. Ignatius Callan (1947–52)
Br. Gerald Murphy (1953–57)
Br. Oswald Wall (1958)
Br. Gerard Mullin (1959–64)
Br. Cyprian Tuite (1965–70)
Br. Neil Hyland (1971–72)
Br. Majella Sherry (1973–74)
Br. Arnold Turner (1975–79)
Br. Hugh Graham (1980–82)
Br. Terence Costello (1983–95)
Br. Denis Turner (1995)
Mr. Peter Fava (1996–2015)
Mr. Hedley Aitken (2015)
Mr. Simon Stack (2016–present)

Notable alumni

 Inoke Afeaki – rugby union
 Stanley Afeaki – rugby union
 Craig Bradshaw – basketball
 John Callen – actor
 Lee Donoghue – actor
 John Dougan – All Black
 Marvin Karawana – rugby league & rugby union
 Sione Katoa- rugby league
 Issac Luke – rugby league
 Ben Matulino – rugby league
 Alan Schirnack – rugby league
 Jason Schirnack – rugby league
 Sam Tagataese – rugby league 
 Earl Va'a – rugby union
 Matt Visser – physicist and mathematician
 Genesis Mamea Lemalu rugby union

See also
 List of schools in New Zealand
 List of Marist Brothers schools

References

Sources
 Pat Gallagher, The Marist Brothers in New Zealand Fiji & Samoa 1876–1976, New Zealand Marist Brothers' Trust Board, Tuakau, 1976.

External links
 St Bernards College official website

Boys' schools in New Zealand
Educational institutions established in 1946
Marist Brothers schools
Catholic secondary schools in the Wellington Region
Schools in Lower Hutt
1946 establishments in New Zealand